State Route 139  (SR 139) is a  state highway that serves as a north–south connection between Maplesville and the Montevallo area. It travels through parts of Chilton, Bibb, and Shelby counties. The southern terminus is an intersection with SR 22 in Maplesville, and its northern terminus is at an intersection with SR 25 southwest of Wilton.

Route description
SR 139 begins at an intersection with SR 22 in Maplesville. From this point, it follows a generally northerly course through Bibb County, and travels through Randolph and Brierfield, en route to its northern terminus, an intersection with SR 25 southwest of Wilton in Shelby County.

Major intersections

See also

References

139
Transportation in Chilton County, Alabama
Transportation in Bibb County, Alabama
Transportation in Shelby County, Alabama